Vaalvi is a 2023 Indian Marathi-language Dark-comedy thriller film directed by Paresh Mokashi and produced by Zee Studios and Madhugandha Kulkarni. The film stars Swapnil Joshi,  Anita Date, Subodh Bhave, Shivani Surve, Asha Dynate & Namrata Sambherao in lead roles. It was  theatrically released on 13 January 2023 and digitally premiered on 24 February 2023 on ZEE5.

Cast 
 Swapnil Joshi as Aniket 
 Anita Date-Kelkar as Avani
 Subodh Bhave as Anshuman
 Shivani Surve as Devika
 Namrata Sambherao

Release

Theatrical
The trailer of the Vaalvi was released on YouTube on 4 January 2023 and film was  theatrically released on 13 January 2023.

Home Media
It is scheduled to be OTT release on ZEE5 on 24 February 2023.

Reception

Critical reception
Vaalvi Movie received Positive reviews from critics. A Reviewer of Scroll.in wrote "The pitch-perfect cast has just the right attitude to a movie that invites us to consider the depth of human depravity and instead gives us an efficient and effective cruel comedy, as bloodless as it is ruthless". Akhilesh Nerlekar of Loksatta wrote "The dialogues, background music, cinematography have all come together well. There are subtle mistakes at some places, but if you ignore them, you can enjoy this movie. The works of Swapnil Joshi, Anita Date, Shivani Surve and Subodh Bhave have been done well". Jaydeep Pathak of Maharashtra Times says "Even though the content of the film is very serious and 'tense', 'dark humor' keeps sneaking in the film from time to time with cheesy dialogues. The 'grey' shade in the content perfectly captures Mangesh Dhakane's background score".

Box office
Valvi has collected ₹1.88 crore at the box office in its first week. Film collected ₹1.40 crore in 4 days and 2.54 crore in 9 days of its release. The film was collected ₹3 crores in the first 2 weeks. Film crossed  at Box office in its five weeks run.

Future
Vaalvi 2 was announced at a party on the occasion of Paresh Mokashi's birthday. Madhugandha Kulkarni, Paresh Mokashi and Mangesh Kulkarni of Zee Studios announced that they are coming up with Vaalvi 2 soon.

References

External links 
 
Vaalvi on ZEE5

2023 films
2020s Marathi-language films
Indian comedy thriller films
Indian black comedy films
2020s comedy thriller films
2020s black comedy films